John Leonard "Leon" Lagerlöf (8 April 1870 – 30 November 1951) was a Swedish sport shooter who competed in the 1912 Summer Olympics, in the 1920 Summer Olympics, and in the 1924 Summer Olympics.

In 1912 he finished 29th in the 600 metre free rifle competition.

Eight years later he won the silver medal as member of the Swedish team in the team small-bore rifle event and the bronze medal in the team 300 metre military rifle, standing competition. In the team free rifle event he finished sixth. He also participated in the 300 metre free rifle, three positions event and in the 50 metre small-bore rifle competition.

In 1924 he finished twelfth in the 50 metre rifle, prone competition.

References

External links
profile

1870 births
1951 deaths
Swedish male sport shooters
ISSF rifle shooters
Olympic shooters of Sweden
Shooters at the 1912 Summer Olympics
Shooters at the 1920 Summer Olympics
Shooters at the 1924 Summer Olympics
Olympic silver medalists for Sweden
Olympic bronze medalists for Sweden
Olympic medalists in shooting
Medalists at the 1920 Summer Olympics
19th-century Swedish people
20th-century Swedish people